The eastern Pacific roughy (Hoplostethus pacificus) is a slimehead of the order Beryciformes. It is found in the Southeast Pacific from Ecuador and the Galápagos Islands to Peru.

References

Hoplostethus
Fish of Ecuador
Fish of Peru
Galápagos Islands coastal fauna
Fish described in 1899